IPAC may refer to:

 Infrared Processing and Analysis Center, a NASA science center at Caltech
 International Plus, Advanced & Challenge Square Dance Convention, an international square dance event
 Inter-Parliamentary Alliance on China
 Iraq Peace Action Coalition, an antiwar organization based in Minneapolis, Minnesota
 Internet Protocol Automatic Configuration, see 
 IpAc, a shorthand for the chemical isopropyl acetate
 Inter-Party Advisory Committee, in Ghana; see

See also
 iPAQ, a personal digital assistant from Compaq (now Hewlett Packard)
 AIPAC, American Israel Public Affairs Committee
 OPAC, Online Public Access Catalog